Smiddyburn is a 1981 folk album recorded by Dave Swarbrick and named after the farm in Aberdeenshire where Swarbrick lived at the time. The tracks are mostly renditions of traditional folk tunes, and Swarbrick is assisted by his erstwhile colleagues from Fairport Convention as well as his early mentor, Beryl Marriott.

Track listing
All tracks credited to "Trad. arr. Dave Swarbrick" unless otherwise noted

Side one
"Wat Ye Wha I Met the Streen"/"The Ribbons of the Redheaded Girl"/"Ril Gan Ainm" (4:48)
"Sir Charles Coote"/"Smiths" (2:43)
"I Have a Wife of My Own"/"Lady Mary Haye's Scotch Measure" (3:37)
"Wishing"/"The Victor's Return"/"The Gravel Walk" (5:15)

Side two
"When The Battle is Over" (3:37)
"Sword Dance"/"The Young Black Crow" (4:18)
"Sean O'Dwyer of the Glen"/"The Hag With The Money"/"Sleepy Maggie" (4:52)
"It Suits Me Well" - (Sandy Denny) (5:48)

Personnel
Tracks 1, 4, 6 and 8 are with Fairport Convention and Richard Thompson

Dave Swarbrick - violin, mandolin, vocals
Simon Nicol - guitar
Dave Pegg - bass, mandolin
Dave Mattacks - drums, percussion
Richard Thompson - guitar, mandolin, mandocello
Beryl Marriott - piano, piano accordion, clavichord
John McCormack - double bass
Bruce Rowland - drums
Roger Marriott - harmonica

References

Dave Swarbrick albums
1981 albums
Albums produced by John Wood (record producer)